John Austin Wharton (July 23, 1828 – April 6, 1865) was a lawyer, plantation owner, and Confederate general during the American Civil War. He is considered one of the Confederacy's best tactical cavalry commanders.

Early life
Wharton was born near Nashville, Tennessee, as the only child of Sarah Groce Wharton and William H. Wharton, later a leading politician during the Texas Revolution. He was named after his uncle, John Austin Wharton. When he was still an infant, the family moved to what became Brazoria County, Texas. In 1846, Wharton enrolled at South Carolina College where he was a member of the Euphradian Society. Two years later, he married Eliza Penelope Johnson, the daughter of David Johnson, the Governor of South Carolina.

After graduating in 1850, Wharton returned to Texas and studied law, establishing his practice in Brazoria. He became a wealthy plantation owner and slave holder. In 1860, he supported John C. Breckinridge's candidacy for the Presidency and served as an elector.

Civil War
An ardent secessionist, Wharton enlisted in the Confederate Army as captain of Company B, 8th Texas Cavalry, also known as "Terry's Texas Rangers." Commissioned as colonel of the regiment, Wharton fought with distinction at the Battle of Shiloh, where he was wounded. Wharton served under Gen. Braxton Bragg during the 1862 invasion of eastern Kentucky. He was promoted to brigadier general on November 18, 1862, and was again wounded, this time at Murfreesboro, Tennessee.

Wharton again distinguished himself at Chickamauga and was promoted to the rank of major general. He was assigned to the Trans-Mississippi Department in Louisiana in February 1864, leading the cavalry under Lt. Gen. Richard Taylor during the Red River Campaign.
 
Shortly before the end of the war in 1865, a fellow Confederate cavalry officer, Col. George Wythe Baylor (1832–1916) (brother of Confederate Arizona Governor Colonel John Baylor) killed Wharton in Houston, over a simmering dispute on military matters. The incident began with an argument on the street outside of the Fannin Hotel, the headquarters of Maj. Gen. John B. Magruder. The two officers had quarreled in the past, but this time Wharton came into Magruder's quarters and, as Baylor later claimed, called Baylor a liar. Baylor shot the unarmed Wharton and killed him instantly.

Wharton is interred at Texas State Cemetery in Austin, Texas.

See also

List of American Civil War generals (Confederate)

Notes

References
 Bailey, Anne, "John Austin Wharton", The Confederate General, Vol. 6, Davis, William C., and Julie Hoffman (eds.), National Historical Society, 1991, .
 Eicher, John H., and David J. Eicher, Civil War High Commands. Stanford: Stanford University Press, 2001. .
 Sifakis, Stewart. Who Was Who in the Civil War. New York: Facts On File, 1988. .
 Warner, Ezra J. Generals in Gray: Lives of the Confederate Commanders. Baton Rouge: Louisiana State University Press, 1959. .
 Winters, John D. The Civil War in Louisiana. Baton Rouge: Louisiana State University Press, 1963. .

External links
Handbook of Texas Online

1828 births
1865 deaths
1865 murders in the United States
Confederate States Army major generals
People from Brazoria County, Texas
People of Texas in the American Civil War
Deaths by firearm in Texas
American planters
Burials at Texas State Cemetery
People murdered in Texas
Male murder victims
American slave owners
University of South Carolina alumni
Military personnel from Texas